Delias paoaiensis is a species of pierine butterfly  endemic to  Cordillera Central Mountains of Luzon, in the Philippines.

The wingspan is 52–56 mm. The species was originally described as a subspecies of Delias nuydaorum, but can be distinguished by the paler yellow marking on the underside of the forewings and hindwings.

References

paoaiensis
Butterflies described in 1987